Progress M-32 was a Russian unmanned Progress cargo spacecraft, which was launched in July 1996 to resupply the Mir space station.

Launch
Progress M-32 launched on 31 July 1996 from the Baikonur Cosmodrome in Kazakhstan. It used a Soyuz-U rocket. The launch was postponed several times, primarily following problems with quality control during Soyuz-U production.

Docking
Progress M-32 docked with the forward port of the Mir Core Module on 2 August 1996 at 22:03:40 UTC, and was undocked on 18 August 1996 at 09:33:45 UTC to make way for Soyuz TM-24. On 3 September 1996 at 09:35:00 UTC, Progress M-32 was redocked at the aft port of the Kvant-1 module of Mir, following the departure of Soyuz TM-23. Progress M-32 was finally undocked on 20 November 1996 at 19:51:20 UTC.

Decay
It remained in orbit until 20 November 1996, when it was deorbited. The deorbit burn occurred at 22:42:25 UTC.

See also

 1996 in spaceflight
 List of Progress missions
 List of uncrewed spaceflights to Mir

References

Progress (spacecraft) missions
1996 in Kazakhstan
Spacecraft launched in 1996
Spacecraft which reentered in 1996
Spacecraft launched by Soyuz-U rockets